Willem Jacobsz. Delff (c. October 1580 – 14 April 1638) was a Dutch Golden Age engraver and painter.

Biography
Delff was born and died in Delft.  He learned painting from his father, Jacob Willemsz. Delff the Elder, who painted a family portrait with his sons and wife Maria Joachimsdr Nagel. Jacob's sons were all artists in their own right; Cornelis (top left in the  portrait) became a still life painter, while Rochus (between Cornelis and his father) became a portrait painter like his father. 
Willem married a daughter of Michiel Jansz van Mierevelt and became a renowned engraver. His son Jacob Willemsz Delff the Younger became a painter.

References

1580 births
1638 deaths
Dutch Golden Age painters
Dutch male painters
Artists from Delft
Dutch engravers